The 7th Street Trafficway Bridge is a one level deck truss bridge over the Kansas River and BNSF Railway tracks on 7th Street.
It was built in 1932. It connects the Armourdale district of Kansas City, Kansas, to the east end of the  Argentine district of Kansas City, Kansas.
In 1970, the bridge was resurfaced, repainted, and a new sister bridge was built.
The new sister bridge is a two lane girder bridge that would now carry southbound lanes, making the deck truss bridge into a northbound bridge only.

It is also called the Herman G. Dillon Bridge, and it survived the 1951 flood.

See also

References

Bridges in Kansas City, Kansas
Bridges over the Kansas River
Bridges completed in 1932
Bridges completed in 1970
Road bridges in Kansas
U.S. Route 169
Bridges of the United States Numbered Highway System
Girder bridges in the United States
1932 establishments in Kansas